Beit Ta'mir is a Palestinian village located six kilometers southeast of Bethlehem.The town is in the Bethlehem Governorate central West Bank. According to the Palestinian Central Bureau of Statistics, the village had a population of 1,229 in 2007. The village is named after the 'Arab al-Ta'mira Bedouin tribe of the Bethlehem area, and along with Tuqu' and  Za'atara forms the 'Arab al-Ta'mira village cluster.

Location
It is bordered by Za'atara  to the east, Hindaza  to the west and north, and Jannatah and Tuqu'  to the south.

History
The village mosque, the Mosque of Omar, has been tentatively dated to 636 CE.

Ottoman era
Beit Ta'mir was incorporated into the Ottoman Empire in 1517 with all of Palestine, and in 1596 it appeared in the  tax registers as being in the nahiya of Al-Quds in the liwa of Al-Quds under the name of Bayt Ta'mar. It had a population of 65 household; who were all Muslims. They paid a fixed  tax-rate of 33.3 % on agricultural products, including wheat, barley,  vegetable and fruit gardens, goats and beehives, in addition to occasional revenues; a total of 8,100 Akçe. Half  of the revenue went to a Waqf.

In 1838, Edward Robinson noted Beit Ta'mar, the village of the Ta'amirah, on his travels in the region, It was also noted as an Arab village, located south of Wadi er-Rahib in the Jerusalem district.  

In 1863, Victor Guérin noted it as an ancient site, inhabited by people of the Ta'amereh tribe.

An Ottoman list from about 1870 notes a "sizable" village with a mosque with a small minaret. The villagers were Bedouin.

In 1883 the PEF's Survey of Western Palestine (SWP) described Beit T'amir:  "a small village on a hill with wells and a few olives. The name is that of an Arab tribe which was originally settled in the place. The village contains a small mosque named after the Khalif Omar."

In 1896 a population list noted that Beit Ta'mir was "half bedouin".

British Mandate era

In the 1945 statistics the population was counted under the name Arab et Ta'amira together with Arab Ibn Ubeid, Arab et Rashayida and Arab et Sawahira; together they had a population of 7,070 Muslims, with  Arab et Ta'amira having a total of  209,888 dunams of land  according to an official land and population survey. Of this, 24 dunams were used plantations and irrigable land, 12,424  for cereals, while 197,440  dunams were classified as non-cultitivable  land.

Jordanian era
In the wake of the 1948 Arab–Israeli War, and after the 1949 Armistice Agreements, Beit Ta’mir came under  Jordanian rule.

In 1961, the population of Ta'amira inhabiting the desert of their central lands was 306, excluding other Ta'amira populations such Za'atara which would number their total population in thousands.

Post 1967
Since the Six-Day War in 1967, Beit Ta'mir has been held under Israeli occupation.

After the 1995 accords, 34.5% of  village land was classified as Area A land, 56.2% as Area B, and the remaining 9.3% as Area C.

References

Bibliography

External links
Welcome to Kh. Bayt Ta'mir
Beit Ta’mir, Welcome to Palestine
Survey of Western Palestine, Map 17: IAA, Wikimedia commons
Beit Ta'mir village (fact sheet),   Applied Research Institute–Jerusalem (ARIJ)
 Beit Ta'mir village profile, ARIJ
Beit Ta'mir aerial photo, ARIJ
The priorities and needs for development in Beit Ta'mir village based on the community and local authorities' assessment, ARIJ

Villages in the West Bank
Bethlehem Governorate
Municipalities of the State of Palestine